Tri-Hill is a neighborhood of the city of York in York County, Pennsylvania, United States. Tri-Hill is located in Spring Garden Township connected to the neighborhood of Violet Hill.

References

Unincorporated communities in Pennsylvania